The Roman Catholic Diocese of Amparo is a diocese located in the city of Amparo in the Ecclesiastical province of Campinas in Brazil.

History
 December 23, 1997: Established as Diocese of Amparo from the Metropolitan Archdiocese of Campinas and Diocese of Limeira

Leadership
 Bishops of Amparo (Latin Rite)
 Francisco José Zugliani (23 Dec 1997  – 14 Jul 2010)
 Pedro Carlos Cipolini (14 Jul 2010  – 6 Jan 2016); formerly of the clergy of the Roman Catholic Archdiocese of Campinas, Brazil; up until now pastor of the Cathedral Basilica "Nossa Senhora de Carmo" and Professor of Theology at the Pontifical Catholic University; born in Caconde, Brazil in 1952 and ordained a priest in 1978
 Luiz Gonzaga Fechio (6 Jan 2016 - Present)

References
 GCatholic.org
 Catholic Hierarchy

Roman Catholic dioceses in Brazil
Amparo, Roman Catholic Diocese of
Christian organizations established in 1997
Roman Catholic dioceses and prelatures established in the 20th century